Hue Help is a registered charity number 1117116 in England and Wales and is a registered international non-governmental organisation in Vietnam. The organisation runs charitable programmes in Thua Thien Hue, Vietnam. Programmes include supporting a home for poor children, providing swimming tuition for children in flood zones and operating an international volunteer programme.

See also
 List of non-governmental organizations in Vietnam

References

External links
 Hue Help official page

Organizations established in 2006
Charities based in Tyne and Wear

Foreign charities operating in Vietnam

Development charities based in the United Kingdom
Child education organizations
Child-related organizations in Vietnam